Daryl Morey (born September 14, 1972) is an American sports executive who is the president of basketball operations of the Philadelphia 76ers of the National Basketball Association (NBA). He co-founded the annual MIT Sloan Sports Analytics Conference. Morey's basketball philosophy, heavily reliant on analytics, favors three-point field goals and lay-ups over mid-range jumpers. This style has been dubbed "Moreyball", as a nod towards Michael Lewis's Moneyball.

During his tenure as general manager for the Houston Rockets from 2007 to 2020, the team posted the second-most wins in the NBA—behind only the San Antonio Spurs. Following the blockbuster trade that brought James Harden to the Rockets, the team posted the third-best record, behind only the Spurs and the Golden State Warriors during Harden's tenure on the team.

Early life and education
Morey was born on September 14, 1972, in Baraboo, Wisconsin. He graduated from Highland High School in Medina, Ohio before receiving a bachelor's degree in computer science with an emphasis on statistics from Northwestern University in 1996, as well as an MBA from the MIT Sloan School of Management.

Career

STATS, Inc.
Morey began his career in 1992 with STATS, Inc., a pioneer sports data firm where Bill James also worked. During his time there he was the first to adapt James' Pythagorean expectation to professional basketball. He found that using 13.91 for the exponents provided an acceptable model for predicting won-lost percentages:

Daryl's "Modified Pythagorean Theorem" was first published in STATS Basketball Scoreboard, 1993–94.

EY Parthenon
In 2000, Morey worked at EY-Parthenon, a leading strategy consulting firm, as a principal consultant with an emphasis on sports.

Other

Morey is the co-chairperson for the annual MIT Sloan Sports Analytics Conference. He is also an avid Esports supporter, has attended MLG (Major League Gaming) events, and was part owner of Clutch Gaming, the Houston, Texas-based League of Legends Championship Series eSports team. Morey is also passionate about musical theater. He commissioned and produced the basketball themed musical Small Ball, which opened in April 2018 at the Catastrophic Theater in Houston, Texas.

Executive career

Boston Celtics
In 2002 Morey left EY-Parthenon to become senior vice president of operations for the Boston Celtics, with responsibility for setting ticket prices and developing analytical methods and technology to enhance basketball decisions related to the draft, trades, free agency, and advance scouting of opponents for the coaching staff.

Houston Rockets
Then-Houston Rockets owner Leslie Alexander named Morey the team's assistant general manager on April 3, 2006. Morey succeeded Carroll Dawson as general manager on May 10, 2007, following the Moreyball trend of integrating advanced statistical analysis with traditional qualitative scouting and basic statistics. Although several teams had previously hired executives with non-traditional basketball backgrounds, the Rockets were the first NBA team to hire such a general manager. In the fall of 2012, he and the Rockets acquired now-All-Star and 2017-18 league MVP James Harden via trade from the Oklahoma City Thunder. During Morey's tenure, the Rockets did not have a losing record and advanced to the playoffs 9 times, including to the Western Conference Finals in 2015 and 2018. He was also named the NBA Executive of the Year in 2018.

On October 15, 2020, the Rockets announced that Morey would step down as general manager on November 1, 2020. He confirmed his departure in a full page ad in the Houston Chronicle on October 18, 2020. After Morey's departure, the Rockets would embark on a rebuild by trading away Russell Westbrook and James Harden. Morey's resignation made Donnie Nelson of the Dallas Mavericks the longest-tenured general manager in the NBA, as Presti was hired in June 2007, a month after Morey became the Rockets' GM.

Philadelphia 76ers
On November 2, 2020, the Philadelphia 76ers named Morey as president of basketball operations.

Morey and the organization selected Tyrese Maxey with the 21st pick in the 2020 NBA Draft, acquired Seth Curry and Danny Green, and signed Dwight Howard in November 2020.

On March 22, 2021, Morey said "3-pointers should be worth 2.5 points" and the court should be widened to make corner 3-pointers longer.

On February 10, 2022, Morey and the 76ers traded for James Harden and Paul Millsap. They traded away a package including Ben Simmons, Seth Curry, Andre Drummond, the 76ers unprotected 2023 first round draft pick, and the 76ers 2027 first round draft pick, top-8 protected.

Media

The Undoing Project
Author of Moneyball, Michael Lewis, chose Daryl Morey as the new nerd-hero at the center of his 2016 book, The Undoing Project. Whereas Moneyball highlighted the plight and success of Billy Beane as GM of the Oakland Athletics in 2003, The Undoing Project reveals Daryl Morey as the underdog king of basketball, making use of a similar analytical method to acquire undervalued talent as Beane did with the A's to produce a forceful team. Lewis uses Morey as a real-world example of one who has exemplified ideas introduced by Daniel Kahneman and Amos Tversky, two Israeli psychologists whose work pioneered the field of behavioral economics. The psychologist duo defined a simple, two-part distinction of the way the brain makes decisions: System 1 and System 2. A more intuitive, subjective, fast, and efficient process, System 1 represents the brain's capacity to make split-second choices, often using personal experience to guide decision-making. System 2, however, characterizes a slower, more analytical process of reasoning to reach a conclusion. Michael Lewis points out in The Undoing Project how Daryl Morey observed basketball experts of the time making awfully subjective assessments in looking at basketball players. Shifting the Rockets' scouting strategy to look at hard data over simple observations, Morey implemented a more System-2-based approach to the team's hiring practices. This strategy is thought to be critically linked to the Houston Rockets' recent success.

Twitter comments on Hong Kong
On October 4, 2019, Morey tweeted in support of the 2019–2020 Hong Kong protests, drawing criticism from Rockets owner Tilman Fertitta, who said that while Morey was the best general manager in the NBA, the Rockets were not a political organization. Morey later deleted the tweet. In mainland China, where the Rockets have an extensive relationship after the selection of Yao Ming in 2002, Morey's tweet resulted in the Chinese Basketball Association's suspension of its relationship with the Rockets and the issuance of a statement of dissatisfaction from the consular office of the People's Republic of China (PRC) in Houston. All Houston Rockets-related items were removed from the Tmall and JD.com sites and the team's games were removed from broadcasting on Tencent. The Associated Press said that the reactions underscored Beijing's sensitivity about foreign attitudes toward the protests.

At the time of the tweet, Morey and the Rockets were in Tokyo for the NBA's Japan Games. He remained isolated in his room at the hotel and only engaged with Toronto Raptors president Masai Ujiri upon the fallout. According to Ujiri, Morey said that the timing of his tweet was in response to a new law in Hong Kong prohibiting protesters from wearing masks and that himself and his friends had discussed political autonomy in Hong Kong since attending MIT Sloan.

A few days later, Morey and the NBA each issued a separate statement addressing the original tweet, with Morey saying that he never intended his tweet to cause any offense and the NBA saying that it was regrettable. The statements were criticized by US politicians and third-party observers for the perceived exercise of economic statecraft by the PRC and insufficiency of the NBA's defense of Morey's tweet. A bipartisan letter by Alexandria Ocasio-Cortez, Ted Cruz, and six other lawmakers fiercely criticized the NBA's handling of the controversy. The lawmakers wrote that the NBA's response not only "sold out an American citizen" but also "reinforces the Chinese Communist Party view that those who point to Chinese repression in Hong Kong are at best stating opinions, not facts", as well as being "a betrayal of fundamental American values". Critics also contrasted the league's disparate response to Morey's tweet with its history of political activism and compared the incident to an October 2 South Park episode "Band in China" which parodies the self-censorship of the American entertainment industry to meet PRC censorship demands. The statements also drew criticism from PRC state-run media for their perceived insufficiency, as Morey himself did not apologize.

NBA commissioner Adam Silver later defended the league's response to the tweet, supporting Morey's right to freedom of expression while also accepting the right of reply from the government of and businesses from mainland China. Further fallout from the tweet included the decision by China Central Television to cancel the broadcasting of two NBA preseason games, pro-Hong Kong protest demonstrations held at preseason games in the United States involving teams from the Chinese Basketball Association, the cancellation of NBA Cares community events in Shanghai, criticism by then-president Donald Trump of the perceived double standards by the reactions of specific coaches to NBA response relative to their past criticisms of his policies, and the suspension/termination of all mainland Chinese sponsors of the NBA. A Fox Business article said that the NBA would look to Africa and India for growth if the league were to sever ties with mainland China as a result of the tweet.

References

External links

Daryl Morey’s ‘Small Ball’ Musical Is Very Good and Very Weird The Ringer. April 10, 2018.
Daryl Morey Built an Elite N.B.A. Team. Now He’s Building a Musical. The New York Times. October 3, 2017.
Basketball’s Nerd King: How Daryl Morey used behavioral economics to revolutionize the art of NBA draft picks. Slate. December 6, 2016.
Discovering Hidden Gems: The Story of Daryl Morey, Shane Battier, and the Houston Rockets Harvard Business School. September 24, 2010.
The No-Stats All-Star  The New York Times. February 13, 2009.
How Do You Know ... This Game Isn't Rocket Science? ESPN The Magazine. October 22, 2008.
Houston’s G.M. Is a Revolutionary Spirit in a Risk-Averse Mind The New York Times. January 28, 2008.
10 Questions with Daryl Morey ClutchFans. May 22, 2006.
Daryl Morey's Modified Pythagorean Theorem

1972 births
Living people
Basketball people from Wisconsin
Boston Celtics personnel
Houston Rockets general managers
MIT Sloan School of Management alumni
Northwestern University alumni
People from Baraboo, Wisconsin
Philadelphia 76ers executives